Slanguage is the third collaborative studio album by Awol One and Daddy Kev. It was released on Mush Records on March 18, 2003. It features contributions from D-Styles.

Critical reception
Rob Theakston of AllMusic gave the album 3 stars out of 5, saying, "it's probably the closest fusion of free improv jazz and hip-hop that's ever been committed to disc." He called it "a record that requires intense concentration and immediate attention in order for everything to make sense." Dave Heaton of PopMatters said, "Slanguage finds Awol One and Daddy Kev taking a schizophrenic approach to MCing and DJing, switching everything up constantly, while creating a continuous mood that makes the album feel more like one piece of music than a collection of songs."

Track listing

Personnel
 Awol One – vocals, keyboards
 Daddy Kev – production, arrangement, percussion
 D-Styles – turntables

References

External links
 

2003 albums
Awol One albums
Mush Records albums
Collaborative albums